Charles William Martin (25 October 1828 – 25 February 1905) was a French sailor who represented his country at the 1900 Summer Olympics in Meulan, France. With Jacques Baudrier as helmsman and fellow crewmember Félix Marcotte, Jules Valton and Jean Le Bret Martin took the 2nd place in first race of the .5 to 1 ton and finished 3rd in the second race.

Further reading

References

External links

1828 births
1905 deaths
French male sailors (sport)
Olympic sailors of France
Sailors at the 1900 Summer Olympics – .5 to 1 ton
Sailors at the 1900 Summer Olympics – 3 to 10 ton
Sportspeople from Rouen
Medalists at the 1900 Summer Olympics
Olympic silver medalists for France
Olympic bronze medalists for France
Olympic medalists in sailing
Sailors at the 1900 Summer Olympics – Open class